The Novas Conquistas or "New Conquests" are a group of seven  concelhos (administrative subdistricts or municipalities) of Goa and Damaon, officially known as Portuguese India. They were added into Goa in the eighteenth century AD, a comparatively later date than the original three concelhos that make up the Velhas Conquistas or "Old Conquests". 

The seven concelhos of the Novas Conquistas are Pernem, Bicholim, Sattari, Antruz (Ponda), Sanguem (modern-day Sanguem and Dharbandora talukas), Quepem, and Canacona. Silvassa was a newly conquered area in the territory of Damaon, Diu& Silvassa

In writing postal addresses, the Novas Conquistas were abbreviated "N.C."

History 
In December 1764 Hyder Ali, the king of Mysore, sent his general Fazalullah Khan northward into Soonda via Bednur, where landowners who resisted his administration met severe retribution. Fearing capture, the Raja of Soonda fled to Goa, surrendering his territories below the Western Ghats to the Portuguese in exchange for sanctuary and a fixed annual stipend. The lower territories including the port of Sadashivgad near Karwar were absorbed into the Kingdom of Mysore.   

These new areas granted by the Raja of Soonda were incorporated into Portuguese Goa. 

Later in 1783 the Kingdom of Sawantwadi, in order to get Portuguese help against Kolhapur, ceded some parts of Pernem, Bicholim and Sattari to Portugal. The remaining part of Pernem (including Terekhol Fort) was ceded in 1788 and thus came to be known as the Novas Conquistas (New Conquests). Unlike the Velhas Conquistas, these areas remained predominantly Hindu because the Portuguese government had dismissed the Society of Jesus (the missionary order responsible for the majority of the Christianization of Goa) in 1759.

References

See also
Velhas Conquistas

Colonial Goa
Districts of Goa
Former districts of India